"500 dagar om året" is a song written by Swedish musician Tomas Ledin, and recorded on his 2009 studio album 500 dagar om året. It was also released as a downloadable single the same year. The album version is longer than the single version.

The single peaked at 16th position at the Swedish singles chart. It also charted at Svensktoppen 2009 for nine weeks, peaking at 4th position.

Track listing 
 "500 dagar om året" – 3:54

Chart positions

References

2009 singles
Songs written by Tomas Ledin
Tomas Ledin songs
2009 songs
Universal Music Group singles